The Quiet Earth is a 1981 science fiction novel by New Zealand writer Craig Harrison. The novel was adapted into a 1985 New Zealand science fiction film of the same name directed by Geoff Murphy.

The 2013 Penguin edition includes an introduction by Bernard Beckett.

Plot summary

Alone
John Hobson, a geneticist involved in a project concerned with manipulating DNA, awakes in his hotel room in Thames, New Zealand, after a nightmare of falling from a great height. His wristwatch has stopped at 6:12. Upon getting up he finds the electricity off. It is quiet outside, with nobody in sight. Hobson checks the time in his car, finding the vehicle's clock is also frozen at 6:12. This perplexes him, as the vehicle's clock runs ahead of his wristwatch by several minutes. 

The town's shops are locked and unattended, with no sign of people. Investigating a car sitting at an intersection, Hobson sees that the driver's seatbelt is still fastened. Telephones are dead and there is only static on the radio. All humans and animals have disappeared. No watch or clock shows anything later than 6:12.

Hobson concludes that some force has altered the clocks to show the same time and then stopped them, suggesting an intelligence behind the event, which Hobson dubs "the Effect".

A garden yields the first sign of life Hobson has found – a worm dug up from the soil. The garden is otherwise devoid of fauna. Hobson wonders if he has gone mad, but dismisses the idea.

During the night, Hobson hears sounds from outside approaching. Hobson wills the entity to leave, and the sounds retreat. Uncertainty as to whether the presence was there, or whether it may have been a stray animal spared from the Effect competes in his mind with speculations that the intruder could be a manifestation of the Effect. Hobson reassures himself that he can keep the entity at bay with mental effort.

The next morning Hobson procures weapons and supplies, and leaves for Auckland, finding the city deserted. Hobson seems to be the only human being remaining. He wonders what rendered him immune to the Effect. Hobson hurries to an apparent smoke signal coming from the North Shore, only to find suburban homes destroyed by the impact of a jetliner. The plane was empty when it crashed.

Hobson travels to the research unit, where he worked to reactivate dormant genes in humans and animals using high-frequency sound waves and radiation. The unit's head, Perrin, believed that awakening the dormant genes would lead to a quantum leap in evolution. Hobson finds Perrin in a radiation chamber, dead at the controls of the sound wave machine. The machine appears to have short-circuited, but there is no evidence indicating how Perrin died. Hobson decides he perished before the Effect – as dead animal tissue did not vanish. Hobson retrieves Perrin's papers, then begins journeying to Wellington, hoping to find survivors or clues as to what happened.

En route to Rotorua, Hobson sees a creature in his headlights. The monster is some kind of hybrid of dog and calf. Hobson drives off terror-stricken, unsure as to whether the apparition was really there.

At Rotorua, after realising everyone else is dead, Hobson almost commits suicide. When he comes across live fish in a stream, Hobson concludes that the Effect did not penetrate water. He is startled when an electronic howling noise booms out across Lake Taupo from the far side. Hobson reaches an area of bushland near Turangi, his path blocked by a truck. Back-tracking, he finds the alternate route also cut off. Trying to work around the stalled vehicle, he is confronted by another survivor with a rifle.

Api
The gunman is Apirana Maketu, a Māori and a lance-corporal in the New Zealand Army. "Api" woke up at his barracks in Waiouru to find the base deserted. He remained at his post for two days before setting out to find survivors.

A search of Gisborne and the East Coast yielded nothing, and a visit to the power station at Tokaanu led him to believe the electrical grid was knocked out by a massive surge. Api heard the same sound that Hobson heard – albeit earlier in the day and coming from the side of the lake that Hobson was standing on. Believing it to be a car, Api laid the roadblock to catch anyone coming south.

Api reveals his belief that something hostile is loose in the land. It is present only in certain places, and is stronger at night. The soldier is both relieved and worried to find that Hobson has experienced the same dread.

The two men seem to already know one other, sharing a flash of recognition upon first meeting. Neither can account for this, as they have never encountered each other before.

They speculate about the possibility of other survivors. Api posits that those underground in mines and underwater in submarines might have survived. Hobson recalls the worm, but notes a complete lack of rats, surmising that only animal life below a certain size has escaped the Effect underground. He concedes the possibility of submarine survivors. 

They arrive at the nation's capital to find it devoid of life. Api and Hobson set up dwellings in a hotel and hunt for survivors. Hobson plans to run tests to see if he can determine the nature of the Effect and the reason why he and Api survived.

Api assists Hobson with procuring equipment for the scientist's studies. A radio transceiver is set up, and the duo transmit words and Morse code across the world. They receive no response. Hobson's investigations reveal no reason for their exemption from the Effect. The men face the prospect that they are alone.

Api goes skin-diving for shellfish – he pretends to drown as a joke, and Hobson reacts unconsciously by holding the other man's head underwater. There is a moment of hostility when Api breaks free, resolved when Hobson explains that his son, who was autistic, drowned in a bathtub, and Hobson felt Api was making fun of this. The death of the child led to the end of Hobson's marriage. Both men realise that Hobson is not in complete control of his actions.

Visiting the Beehive, Api speculates that they could be lab rats on some kind of duplicate Earth; it is they who disappeared. Hobson puts no stock in this theory.

Three weeks after the Effect, Hobson is left alone while Api goes to get a new car. Hobson goes into Api's bedroom and finds photographs of Api as a private during the Vietnam War, posing with the mutilated corpses of Viet Cong. Hobson believes that Api is a psychopath.

The End Is the Beginning
Hobson feels helpless to prevent his relationship with Api from deteriorating further and plans to kill Api with sleeping pills.

After searching for a boat to take them to the South Island, during which both men experience an attack of dread from the "force" hounding them, Api takes Hobson for a joyride in his Lotus Elite.

A woman runs into the car's path. She is taken to the hotel and made comfortable, but neither Api nor Hobson are medically trained. Unless she is less badly hurt than she seems, she will die.

The men bicker pointlessly. The woman's condition worsens, and there is nothing her fellow survivors can do for her. Hobson senses the unseen force again, emanating from the empty city. He speculates that the force may have always been a part of the land, and is claiming the Earth.

Api studies the Bible, and later wakes Hobson to tell him that he has solved the clock enigma. 6:12 relates to the Number of the Beast, 666 (6–12 = 6 and 6 plus 6) and to Revelation 6:12, with the Biblical chapter's talk of men hiding from the face of God. Hobson does not believe this, and holds a hidden gun on the deranged soldier. The woman dies, sending Api into hysterics.

After another argument, a full-scale battle with guns and grenades ensues. Hobson kills Api, with the soldier seeming to give up. The scientist is now alone.

Breaking open Perrin's box, Hobson realises his colleagues considered him unbalanced and kept him under surveillance. Perrin believed that Hobson's DNA was altered due to radiation, which caused his child's autism. Hobson believes the Effect was his doing. The project he worked on caused the unravelling of animal DNA; only those with the dormant gene pair were spared.

Flashbacks detail Hobson's last days at the research unit. Perrin seizes upon an accident with the sound wave/radiation machine in which Hobson set the sound modulator too high and was blasted out of his chair by an invisible energy wave. Perrin charges Hobson with negligence, as the sample slides for insects and animals in the machine are blank, while the ones for plants are normal. This event cements for Hobson his long-growing misgivings about the experiments, and what he believes are Perrin's motives for pursuing them.

In a later flashback, Hobson relates how he sabotaged the sound wave machine before going on leave to output a much higher level of infrasound than the controls would register. The idea was to put the machine out of action temporarily, ruining Perrin's chance to use Hobson's theories. Hobson took what he believed to be a fatal dose of sleeping pills on the night before the Effect.

As he reads Perrin's notes, Hobson realises that this sabotage almost certainly caused the Effect. His act always had a different purpose – to kill Perrin. Believing his boss insane and consumed with a desire to play God, Hobson subconsciously altered his own memory to hide this fact from himself.

This ability to edit his own recollections, and to take refuge in a kind of mental "super-reality", is purely automatic. Hobson finally accepts the guilt for letting his son drown. Allowing his child to die was his way of destroying himself, a kind of external suicide. The child's autism mirrored his father's own emptiness. Perhaps Hobson caused the Effect, or is dreaming all this in a barbiturate coma, or is in Hell or Purgatory. Perhaps the rest of humanity evolved, or is unchanged and wondering where Hobson and a handful of others have gone to. With the death of the entire race on his hands, Hobson jumps from the hotel. He gathers speed, then wakes up in his motel room in Thames. Recovering from the nightmare of falling, all he can remember of the dream he was ripped from, he notices that his wrist watch has stopped at 6:12.

References

1981 novels
1981 science fiction novels
20th-century New Zealand novels
Auckland in fiction
British novels adapted into films
New Zealand novels adapted into films
New Zealand science fiction novels
Novels by Craig Harrison
Novels set in New Zealand
Post-apocalyptic novels
Science fiction novels adapted into films
Hodder & Stoughton books